William Henry Brooks (born July 1873) was an English footballer. His regular position was as a forward. He was born in Stalybridge, Cheshire. He played for Manchester United and Stalybridge Rovers.

External links
MUFCInfo.com profile

1873 births
English footballers
Manchester United F.C. players
Stalybridge Rovers F.C. players
Year of death missing
Association football forwards